Ghimpați is a commune located in Giurgiu County, Muntenia, Romania. It is composed of four villages: Copaciu, Ghimpați, Naipu and Valea Plopilor.

Natives
 Liviu Ciobotariu
 Gheorghe Cristescu

References

Communes in Giurgiu County
Localities in Muntenia